A vine is typically the grapevine (Vitis), but can refer more generally to any plant with a growth habit of trailing or climbing stems or runners.

Vine or Vines may also refer to:

Science and technology
 Vine (service), a video app owned by Twitter
 Vine Linux, a Linux distribution
 Vinelink.com, styled as VINE, a website that allows people to track the movements of prisoners
 Vine VNC client and server for OS X, part of the Eggplant GUI test automation tool
 Vine Toolkit, an open source software framework used to create web applications
 Amazon Vine, a program of Amazon.com that gives free products to customers in exchange for reviews
 Banyan VINES, a network operating system
 Microsoft Vine, an online service by Microsoft used to keep in touch with people in case of an emergency
 Vine copula, a graphical tool for labeling constraints in high-dimensional probability distributions

Human names
 Vine (surname)
 Vines (surname)

Music
 Vine (album), by Chris Cheek
 "Vine", a song by Avail from Over the James, 1998
 "Vine", a song by Spratleys Japs from Pony, 1999

Places
 Vine, Indiana, an unincorporated community in the U.S.
 Vine, Zagorje ob Savi, a settlement in the Municipality of Zagorje ob Savi, central Slovenia
 Vines High School, in Plano, Texas, U.S.

Other uses
 Vine (demon), in theology, a denizen of Hell
 VINE Transit, a public transit system in Napa County
 Vine, a female professional wrestler from the Gorgeous Ladies of Wrestling
 Vines, a toy in the Beanie Babies 2.0 line
 The Vine, a bus rapid transit service in Vancouver, Washington

See also
 Grapevine (disambiguation)
 Vine Street (disambiguation)
 The Vines (disambiguation)
 Wine (disambiguation)